The following is the list of honorary titles given to various Indian leaders during Indian independence struggle.

References

India
Indian independence movement
Titles in India